The Barnard Center for Research on Women (BCRW) is a nexus of feminist thought, activism, and collaboration for scholars and activists. Since its founding in 1971, BCRW has promoted women's and social justice issues to its local communities at Barnard College and within New York City. It is a member organization of The National Council for Research on Women.

History 
The Women's Center opened in the fall of 1971. According to its founding charter, the aim of the Women's Center was, "to assure that women can live and work in dignity, autonomy, and equality ... to encourage the open sharing of knowledge and experience, it seeks to increase ties among diverse groups of women". Catharine R. Stimson served as the chairwomen of the task force that created the Women's Center and was its first acting director. Jane S. Gould was appointed acting director in 1972 and permanent director in 1973.

Activities 
Since 1974, BCRW has hosted the annual Scholar and Feminist conference, including the 1982 Barnard Conference on Sexuality.

References

External links 
Barnard Center for Research on Women
Barnard College
The Scholar & Feminist Online

Feminist organizations in the United States
Barnard College
Women in New York City